The Primera División de Fútbol Profesional Clausura 2005 season (officially "Torneo Clausura 2005") started on January 29, 2005.

The season was composed of the following clubs:

 C.D. FAS
 C.D. Municipal Limeño
 San Salvador F.C.
 C.D. Águila
 C.D. Luis Ángel Firpo
 A.D. Isidro Metapán
 C.D. Atlético Balboa
 Alianza F.C.
 Once Lobos
 Once Municipal

Team information

Personnel and sponsoring

Managerial changes

Before the season

During the season

Clausura 2005 standings

C.D. Municipal Limeño played off against Colo-Colo losing the fixture and were eliminated to Segunda División de Fútbol Salvadoreño

Top scorers

Semifinals 1st Leg

Semifinals 2nd Leg

Final

List of foreign players in the league
This is a list of foreign players in Apertura 2005. The following players:
have played at least one apetura game for the respective club.
have not been capped for the El Salvador national football team on any level, independently from the birthplace

C.D. Águila
  Gerson Vásquez
  Jorge Wagner 
  Alejandro Sequeira
   Fábio Pereira de Azevedo
  Julio Medina III

Alianza F.C.
  Martin Garcia
  Yhoner Toro
  Hermes Martínez Misal
  Gabriel Menjumea 
  John Marulanda

Atletico Balboa
  Juan Carlos Mosquera
  Luis Carlos Asprilla
  Ernesto Noel Aquino
  Franklin Webster
  Roberto Bailey Jnr

C.D. FAS
  Victor Hugo Mafla
  Bernard Mullins Campbell
  Williams Reyes
  Alejandro Bentos 
  Marcelo Messias

C.D. Luis Ángel Firpo
  Óscar Abreu Mejía
  Mauro Cajú 
  Ricardo Machado
   Dario Larrosa 
  Juan Carlos Reyes

 (player released mid season)
  (player Injured mid season)
 Injury replacement player

A.D. Isidro Metapán
  Alcides Bandera
  Andrés Bazzano
  Juan Bicca
  Álvaro Méndez
  Nelson Duarte

Municipal Limeno
  Pablo Caballero 
  Gabriel Garcete
  Christian Santamaría
  Carlos Güity 
  Francis Reyes

Once Lobos
  Nestor Ayala
  Anderson Batista
  Pablo Quinones
  Libardo Carvajal

Once Municipal
  Alessandro De Oliveira 
  Paulo Cesar Rodriguez
  Anel Canales
  Miguel Solís
  Juan Pablo Chacon

San Salvador F.C.
  Rodrigo Lagos
  Alexander Obregón
  Carlos Escalante
  Gustavo Cabrera

External links
 

Primera División de Fútbol Profesional Clausura seasons
El
1